Capecastle railway station was on the Ballycastle Railway which ran from Ballymoney to Ballycastle in Northern Ireland.

History

The station was opened by the Ballycastle Railway on 1 February 1882. It was taken over by the Northern Counties Committee on 4 May 1924.

Under the terms of the Transport Act 1947 the London, Midland and Scottish Railway, the Northern Counties Committee parent company, was nationalised by the British Government on 1 January 1948. The Northern Counties Committee (and the Ballycastle Railway) was thus briefly owned by the British Transport Commission. This was only a temporary measure and in 1949 the NCC was transferred to the Ulster Transport Authority (UTA) – owned by the Government of Northern Ireland.

The station closed to passengers on 3 July 1950.

References 

 
 
 

Disused railway stations in County Antrim
Railway stations opened in 1882
Railway stations closed in 1950
Railway stations in Northern Ireland opened in the 19th century